Telpaneca is a municipality in the Madriz department of Nicaragua. It is 218 kilometers from Managua.

Notable places 
Notable places in Telpaneca include la cueva del sapo (the frog's cave), la cuesta de la mona (the monkey's slope) and la virgen del chorro (the virgin waterfall). The nearby Mount Malacaste, located at Santo Domingo, offers a fresh environment and an odor of coffee.

Municipalities of the Madriz Department